Mikun is the name of several inhabited localities in Ust-Vymsky District of the Komi Republic, Russia.

Urban localities
Mikun, a town

Rural localities
Mikun (rural locality), a village in Aykino Selo Administrative Territory